William Arthur Whitlock  (1891–1977) was a notable New Zealand journalist, newspaper editor and proprietor. He was born in Nelson, New Zealand, in 1891.

In 1953, Whitlock was awarded the Queen Elizabeth II Coronation Medal. In the 1961 Queen's Birthday Honours, he was appointed a Commander of the Order of the British Empire, for services to journalism.

References

1891 births
1977 deaths
New Zealand editors
New Zealand magazine editors
People from Nelson, New Zealand
New Zealand Commanders of the Order of the British Empire
20th-century New Zealand journalists